"Galanin dibinda" is an Azerbaijani folk lyric song. It belongs to the round dance genre named "yalli".

The form of the song "Galanin dibinda" is the most popular in the folklore structure (in particular in Azerbaijani) consisting of a pair of periodicities (ААBB). Corresponding to the double holding of a pair of periodicities of each phase, it has as its prototype the principle of the Beit. The basis of its composition is the quarto-quinto-tertz system.

On the foundation of this song, the Russian composer Mikhail Glinka created the Choir for his opera "Ruslan and Lyudmila". So, in 1823 Glinka made a trip to the Caucasus. Getting acquainted with the music of the Caucasus nations, this left a significant mark on the composers creative consciousness that was reflected in his later works on oriental themes. Using the song "Galanin dibinda" in his opera is an example of such a reflection.

The songs intonations are heard in the operetta of the Azerbaijani composer Uzeyir Hajibeyov "Arshin Mal Alan", in the chorus of girls from the second act.

The song was recorded on the notes written by the Azerbaijani composer Said Rustamov.

There is an Azerbaijani dance with the same name performed on the music of the song.

Text

See also 
Ayrılıq
No moles left in Irevan
Şuşanın dağları başı dumanlı

References

Literature

External links 
 Rashid Behbudov - Galanin dibinda

Azerbaijani folk songs
Azerbaijani-language songs
Year of song unknown